MARC (Maryland Area Rail Commuter) is a commuter rail system in the Baltimore–Washington metropolitan area. MARC  is administered by the Maryland Transit Administration (MTA) and operated under contract by Alstom and Amtrak on track owned by CSX Transportation (CSXT) and Amtrak.

Operations 
MARC has three lines that radiate from Union Station in Washington, D.C.: the Brunswick Line (18 weekday trains), the Camden Line (21 weekday trains), and the Penn Line (58 weekday trains). The Penn Line is the only line with weekend service, having 18 trains on Saturdays and 12 on Sundays. Service is reduced or suspended on certain Federal holidays.

All MARC trains operate in push-pull mode. The cab car is typically on the end of the train closest to Washington; on trains with diesel locomotives, this arrangement keeps exhaust further away from Union Station's terminal. Train lengths can vary from the typical three to five cars to 10 cars on Penn Line rush hour trains. Shorter trains typically consist of all single level or all bilevel passenger cars while longer trains may have a combination.

The MTA contracts out operations and maintenance of MARC trains to Amtrak for the Penn Line and Alstom for the Brunswick Line and Camden Line. , with the looming expiration of the Alstom contract, the MTA is soliciting proposals for operations and maintenance of the Brunswick and Camden lines.

Brunswick Line 

The Brunswick Line is a  line that runs on CSX-owned tracks between Washington, D.C., and Martinsburg, West Virginia, with a  branch to Frederick, Maryland. It is descended from Baltimore & Ohio Railroad (B&O) commuter service between Washington and its northern and western suburbs.

Camden Line 

The Camden Line is a  line that runs on CSX-owned tracks between Washington, D.C., and Camden Station in Baltimore. It is descended from B&O commuter routes running between Washington and Baltimore. The B&O began operating over portions of this route in 1830, making it one of the oldest passenger rail lines in the U.S. still in operation.

Penn Line 

The Penn Line is a  line that runs along the far southern leg of Amtrak's Northeast Corridor between Washington, D.C., and Perryville, Maryland, via Baltimore Penn Station. Most trains operate along a  stretch between Washington and Baltimore Penn, with limited service to Martin State Airport and Perryville. Descended from Washington-Baltimore commuter routes operated by the Pennsylvania Railroad (hence the name), it is by far the busiest line, with almost twice as many trains and twice as many passengers as the other two lines combined. The Penn Line is the only line that operates on weekends.

Special Western Maryland service 
MARC has run special weekend trips to and from Cumberland, Maryland for Western Maryland residents to attend sporting events in the Baltimore/Washington area, such as Baltimore Orioles, Baltimore Ravens, Washington Nationals or Washington Commanders games, and for Baltimore/Washington residents to attend Railfest in Cumberland and enjoy the scenic mountains and fall foliage of Western Maryland.

Intermodal connections 
Nearly all stations served by MARC connect with local bus or Metrobus service. Washington Union Station, New Carrollton, College Park, Greenbelt, Silver Spring and Rockville offer connections to the Metrorail subway; Baltimore Penn Station and Camden Station both offer connections to the Baltimore Light RailLink. Additionally, Washington Union Station and Baltimore Penn are the second- and eighth-busiest Amtrak stations in the country, respectively. BWI Airport, Aberdeen, New Carrollton, Rockville, Harpers Ferry and Martinsburg are shared with Amtrak as well. Washington Union Station also offers a connection to the VRE network into Northern Virginia.

History

Origins 
All three MARC lines date from the 19th century. Service on the Baltimore and Ohio Railroad (B&O) between Baltimore and Ellicott City began on May 24, 1830, over part of what is now the Camden Line. B&O service between Baltimore and Washington, the modern Camden Line route, began on August 25, 1835.

The B&O completed its Metropolitan Branch in 1873; most service from Martinsburg and Frederick was diverted onto the Metropolitan Branch to Washington and the old main line became a secondary route. This established the basic route for what would become the Brunswick Line.

The Philadelphia, Wilmington and Baltimore Railroad (PW&B) completed its line between Baltimore and Philadelphia in December 1838, save for the ferry across the Susquehanna River, which was not bridged until the 1860s. Although the B&O was chartered with the unspoken assumption that no competing line would be built between Baltimore and Washington, the Pennsylvania Railroad-owned Baltimore and Potomac Railroad (B&P) was completed between the two cities in 1872. The PW&B was initially hostile to the Pennsylvania (PRR); however, the PRR acquired it in a stock battle with the B&O in 1881. The PW&B soon began operating PRR through servicethe ancestor of Penn Line servicebetween Washington and Philadelphia in conjunction with the B&P. Meanwhile, the PRR ended B&O trackage rights over the PW&B in 1884, forcing it to open its own parallel route in 1886. The PW&B and the B&P were combined into the PRR's Philadelphia, Baltimore and Washington Railroad in 1902.

The B&O ended local service on the Frederick Branch in November 1949. All B&O passenger service between Baltimore and Philadelphia ended in 1958; local service from Washington was curtailed to Camden Station. The B&O continued to offer local service to Brunswick plus long-distance service, while the PRR operated a mix of local, intercity, and long-distance service on the Northeast Corridor. Local service north of Baltimore on the PRR ended around 1964.

Public takeover 

In the mid-20th century, passenger rail service declined owing to a variety of factorsparticularly the advent of the automobileeven while commuting between suburban locations and urban business districts remained common. In 1968, the PRR folded into Penn Central, which took over its passenger operations. On May 1, 1971, Amtrak took over most intercity passenger service in the United States, including some of Penn Central's former routes. The B&O and Penn Central continued to operate their Washington–Baltimore and Washington–Brunswick commuter routes without subsidies.

Amtrak initially operated (with federal subsidy) the Washington–Parkersburg West Virginian (later renamed Potomac Turbo then Potomac Special). The Potomac Special was cut back to a  commuter-based Washington–Cumberland trip, the Blue Ridge, on May 7, 1973. In early 1974, the B&O threatened to discontinue its remaining unsubsidized commuter services, citing heavy losses. On March 1, 1974, the Maryland Department of Transportation (MDOT) began a 50% subsidy of the B&O's Washington–Brunswick and Washington–Baltimore servicethe first state-sponsored commuter rail service to Washington. In 1975, the state signed an operating agreement with the B&O, under which the state provided rolling stock and reimbursed the railroad for all operating losses. On October 31, 1976, Amtrak introduced the Washington–Cincinnati Shenandoah and cut the Blue Ridge to a  Washington–Martinsburg trip. In the late 1970s, West Virginia began to fund the B&O shuttles between Brunswick and Martinsburg; the shuttles were soon incorporated as extensions of Brunswick service in order to secure Urban Mass Transportation Administration subsidies. In December 1981, MDOT purchased 22 ex-PRR coaches for use on B&O lines. The Maryland State Railroad Administration (SRA) was established in 1986 to administer contracts, procure rolling stock, and oversee short line railroads in the state.

Conrail took over the unsubsidized ex-PRR Baltimore–Washington service from Penn Central at its creation on April 1, 1976. MDOT began subsidizing that service after Conrail threatened to discontinue service on April 1, 1977. Prior to 1978, most ex-PRR Baltimore–Washington service was operated by aging MP54 electric multiple units, most dating back to the line's 1933 electrification. In 1978, Amtrak and the City of Baltimore negotiated with the New Jersey Department of Transportation to lease a number of new Arrow railcars to replace the MP54s. With funding from Pennsylvania and Maryland, Amtrak used some of the cars to initiate a Philadelphia–Washington commuter trip, the Chesapeake, on April 30, 1978. The Chesapeake stopped at some local stations but fewer than the Conrail service; it provided commuter service from north of Baltimore for the first time since the 1960s.

BWI Rail Station opened for Amtrak and Conrail trains on October 26, 1980. In August 1982, Conrail trains began stopping at Capital Beltway station, used by intercity trains since 1970.  and  stations were closed. Two additional round tripsone in the peak direction, and one reverse for commuters working in Baltimorewere added on July 5, 1983. On October 30, 1983, Amtrak and MARC moved from Capital Beltway into a new platform and waiting room at nearby New Carrollton station, served by Metro since 1978. The Edmondson Avenue and Frederick Road stops in Baltimore were replaced by West Baltimore station on April 30, 1984.

In 1981, MDOT began installing highway signs to point drivers to commuter rail stations. The Northeast Rail Service Act of 1981 allowed Conrail to shed its commuter rail operations in 1983 in order to focus on its more profitable freight operations. On January 1, 1983, public operators (including Metro-North Railroad, NJ Transit, and SEPTA Regional Rail) took over Conrail commuter rail systems in the Northeast. MDOT began paying Amtrak to run the ex-PRR Washington–Baltimore service. That service was branded as AMDOT (Amtrak Maryland Department of Transportation). In October 1983, with low patronage and largely duplicated by the MDOT-subsidized service, the Chesapeake was discontinued. In 1984, the SRA introduced a unified brand for its three subsidized lines, MARC (originally short for Maryland Rail Commuter, later modified to Maryland Area Rail Commuter). Operations remained the same, but public-facing elements like schedules and crew uniforms were consolidated under the new name. MARC soon began calling its three lines the Penn Line, Camden Line, and Brunswick Line.

Improved service 

In October 1986, MARC began testing an Amtrak AEM-7 locomotive, looking to use push-pull trains to replace the Arrows. On February 27, 1989, MARC increased Washington–Baltimore service from 7 to 13 weekday round trips. Two more round trips were added in May 1989.

Between 1988 and 1993, MARC expanded service from 34 to 70 total daily trips across the system. In 1995, 800 parking spaces were added to Odenton station.

From 1989 to 1996, the Camden Line had high ridership growth and substantial changes to its stations. A new station at  just off Route 32 was opened on July 31, 1989. MARC began service to Greenbelt station on May 3, 1993, seven months before Metro began serving the station. On January 31, 1994, MARC expanded midday service on the Camden and Brunswick lines, opened Laurel Race Track station to relieve a parking shortage at Laurel station, and closed the underused Berwyn station on the Camden Line. On December 12, 1994, Muirkirk station (originally planned as South Laurel) was opened to reduce congestion on nearby Route 1. In 1996, a $1.2 million project added 600 parking spaces at Savage station to relieve crowding. In July 1996, the Elkridge station was closed and replaced with Dorsey station, which has a larger parking area and a dedicated interchange with Route 100.

On April 30, 1987, the B&O was merged into CSX. CSX continued to operate Camden and Brunswick Line service. On July 6, 1987, MARC opened Metropolitan Grove station – the first new station on the Brunswick line in over a century.

1996 Silver Spring collision 

On February 16, 1996, during the Friday evening rush hour, an eastbound train headed to Washington Union Station via the Brunswick Line collided with the westbound Amtrak Capitol Limited headed to Chicago via Pittsburgh. The collision occurred at Georgetown Junction on a snow-swept stretch of track just west of Silver Spring, Maryland. The crash left 11 people dead aboard the MARC train. Three died of injuries suffered in the impact alone, with the rest succumbing to the ensuing smoke and flames or a combination of the two. Engineer Ricky Orr and conductors Jimmy Major Jr. and Jim Quillen were among the victims. Eight Jobs Corps students also were killed during the accident.

The NTSB report concluded that the MARC crew apparently forgot the approach signal aspect of the Kensington color-position signal after making a flag stop at Kensington station. The MARC train was operating in push mode with the cab control car out front. The Amtrak locomotives were in the crossover at the time of the collision; the MARC cab control car collided with the lead Amtrak unit, F40PH #255, rupturing its fuel tank and igniting the fire that caused most of the casualties. The second unit was a GE Genesis P40DC #811, a newer unit that has a fuel tank that is shielded in the center of the frame. The official investigation also suggests that the accident might have been prevented if a human-factors analysis had been conducted when modifications to the track signaling system were made in 1992 with the closing of nearby QN tower.

Operations and maintenance contracting controversy 
In June 2010, the MTA began looking for a new operations and maintenance contractor to replace CSX Transportation for the Camden and Brunswick lines.

Controversy arose when the French-owned and Montgomery County, Maryland-based Keolis (already operating Virginia Railway Express trains) was the only bidder for the contract. The bidding process was suspended in late 2010 due to lack of competition. Before bidding reopened in 2011, Maryland passed a law (at the request of Leo Bretholz and other Holocaust survivors) requiring Keolis's majority owner, French state railway company SNCF, to fully disclose its role in transporting Jews to concentration camps during World War II (while SNCF was under control of the Nazi government). This disclosure would need to meet the satisfaction of the Maryland state archivist before Keolis would be allowed to place a bid for MARC service. Keolis faced similar issues while bidding for VRE operations in 2009 before eventually being awarded the contract.

Keolis and SNCF lawyers claimed that all documentation required by the law had been produced long before. This was also asserted by Don Phillips in the July 2011 issue of Trains Magazine. Phillips states that a full 914-page independent report and complete history of SNCF's role in the Holocaust, released in 1996, is currently being translated into English. Phillips cites from the publicly available English introduction to the report, noting that while some SNCF workers worked with the Nazis, acts of sabotage were frequent, and the Nazis shot 819 SNCF workers for refusing to carry out the rail orders of the government. An additional 1200 railway workers were themselves sent to concentration camps over SNCF rails. Phillips also notes that SNCF does business with the Israel rail system and works without government prompting to educate the current generation about the war and Holocaust.

In June 2011, the future of Keolis's ability to bid on the MARC contract remained up in the air with the new disclosure law in place. No other bidder had emerged to replace CSXT. On June 5, 2011, The Washington Post ran an editorial critical of the disclosure law. The Post claimed that SNCF has been working for years on digitizing its records, and the Maryland law may require items or formats counter to SNCF's current system and/or French law. The article also stated that some in the Maryland Attorney General's Office worried the law was not Constitutional, may risk retaliation towards Maryland firms overseas, and may risk federal funding for Maryland "by imposing arbitrary procurement demands on a single company".

MTA issued a new RFP for the operations and maintenance of MARC services on the Brunswick and Camden Lines on July 14, 2011, with a deadline for proposals on November 21, 2011. The terms specified a nearly six-year base contract with a five-year renewal option. On October 17, 2012, the $204 million contract was awarded to the Canadian company Bombardier Transportation, effectively ending the Keolis controversy. The pre-service transition period began on the Thursday of that week, during which time CSXT continued to operate MARC trains. The five-year renewal was exercised in 2018. The contract passed to Alstom in 2021 when they purchased Bombardier.

Rolling stock 
The following tables summarize current and former MARC rolling stock.

Locomotives

Passenger cars

Proposals for service expansion

2007 plan 
In the first decade of the 21st century, MARC ridership increased significantly, and the system neared capacity for its current configuration. With the area population growing and the BRAC process poised to bring new jobs to Aberdeen Proving Ground and Ft. Meade, both near MARC stations, the state saw the need to expand service. In September 2007, MTA Maryland unveiled an ambitious 30-year plan of system improvements. Though funding sources had not been established at that time, the plan represented the state's goals of increasing capacity and flexibility. Proposed improvements included:

Acquisition of new equipment. 54 Bombardier MultiLevels were ordered to replace aging single-level cars.
Weekend service on the Penn Line. Service began on December 7, 2013, between Baltimore and Washington, D.C., with some trips extending to Martin State Airport. There are nine round trips on Saturdays (three begin and three then later end at Martin State Airport) and 6 round trips on Sundays (two begin and two then later end at Martin State Airport).
Increased mid-day service and reverse commute service on the Camden and Brunswick Lines. As of 2015, there is a somewhat limited reverse commute service in effect on the Camden Line.
Extension of service past Union Station in Washington to L'Enfant and to Northern Virginia along tracks used by VRE trains, thus relieving pressure on the Washington Metro
More daily trips east of Baltimore's Penn Station, including improved service to Aberdeen Proving Ground
Service beyond Perryville to Newark or Wilmington in Delaware, providing a connection to SEPTA commuter trains to Philadelphia and beyond
New or expanded tunnels along the Northeast Corridor in Baltimore
New stations in Baltimore, providing direct connections with the Metro Subway, and service to Johns Hopkins Hospital and Bayview Medical Center
Rapid transit-like service through Baltimore

Some of the proposals were foreseen to take years or decades to implement, however others such as Penn Line weekend service could have begun in a matter of months, yet budgetary shortfalls prevented this. In Spring 2009, to offset such budget shortfalls, ticket sales employees at most non-Amtrak stations were replaced with Amtrak "Quik-Trak" touchscreen ticket machines, and some train services were eliminated or scaled back. The only remaining staffed stations, Odenton and Frederick, remained staffed by Commuter Direct.

2010s: Extension to Delaware and SEPTA 
In 2017, the Wilmington Area Planning Council submitted ridership studies to Cecil County, the Delaware Valley Regional Planning Commission, SEPTA and the Delaware Department of Transportation for the extension of MARC service from Perryville via Elkton to Newark, Delaware, and possibly Wilmington. The section from Perryville to Newark is the one of only three along the Northeast Corridor not covered by commuter train service (the others are between New London, Connecticut, and Wickford Junction, Rhode Island as well as New York Penn Station and New Rochelle, New York). The Route 5 bus operated by Cecil Transit formerly connected the two stations.

References

External links 

Maryland Transit Administration
Baltimore Area Transit & MARC System Map
MARC Current Train Status Using GPS Technology

 
Commuter rail in the United States
Railway services introduced in 1984
Maryland railroads
High-speed trains of the United States
Washington, D.C., railroads
Passenger rail transportation in Maryland
Passenger rail transportation in Washington, D.C.
Passenger trains running at least at 200 km/h in commercial operations
Standard gauge railways in the United States
Electric railways in Maryland
1984 establishments in the United States